Slavoljub Đorđević (born 15 February 1981) is a Serbian professional football coach and a former defender. He is the head coach of Radnik Surdulica.

Honours
Leotar
 Premier League of Bosnia and Herzegovina: 2002–03
Red Star Belgrade
 First League of Serbia and Montenegro: 2003–04
 Serbia and Montenegro Cup: 2003–04
 Serbian Cup: 2009–10
Bunyodkor
 Uzbek League: 2011
 Uzbekistan Cup: 2012

Managerial statistics

External links
 
 
 
 

Association football defenders
Austrian Football Bundesliga players
Expatriate footballers in Austria
Expatriate footballers in Bosnia and Herzegovina
Expatriate footballers in Russia
Expatriate footballers in Ukraine
Expatriate footballers in Uzbekistan
FC Bunyodkor players
FC Kryvbas Kryvyi Rih players
FC Shinnik Yaroslavl players
FC Spartak Vladikavkaz players
FC Volyn Lutsk players
First League of Serbia and Montenegro players
FK Jedinstvo Ub players
FK Leotar players
FK Radnički Niš players
Premier League of Bosnia and Herzegovina players
Red Star Belgrade footballers
Red Star Belgrade non-playing staff
Russian Premier League players
SC Rheindorf Altach players
Serbia and Montenegro expatriate footballers
Serbia and Montenegro expatriate sportspeople in Bosnia and Herzegovina
Serbia and Montenegro expatriate sportspeople in Russia
Serbia and Montenegro expatriate sportspeople in Ukraine
Serbia and Montenegro footballers
Serbia and Montenegro under-21 international footballers
Serbian expatriate footballers
Serbian expatriate sportspeople in Austria
Serbian expatriate sportspeople in Russia
Serbian expatriate sportspeople in Ukraine
Serbian expatriate sportspeople in Uzbekistan
Serbian footballers
Serbian SuperLiga players
Footballers from Belgrade
Ukrainian Premier League players
Uzbekistan Super League players
1981 births
Living people
Serbian football managers
FK Vojvodina managers
Serbian SuperLiga managers